The Colombia women's national football team represents Colombia in international women's football competitions and are controlled by the Colombian Football Federation. They are a member of the CONMEBOL. The team is currently ranked 28th in the FIFA Ranking and have qualified for three FIFA Women's World Cups, in Germany 2011, Canada 2015 and Australia–New Zealand 2023.

Colombia is one of South America's best-ranked national teams, and are also the third nation of the continent to qualify for World Cup and the Olympics, besides Brazil and Argentina. Colombia was the first Spanish-speaking country to win a game in the Women's World Cup and whose women's team advanced beyond the group stage in a World Cup (in 2015).

Las Cafeteras also had participated in all Copa América Femenina editions since 1998. Colombia were runners-up in 2010, 2014 and 2022.

History

Team image

Nicknames
The Colombia women's national football team has been known or nicknamed as the "".

Home stadium
The Colombia play their home matches on the Estadio Metropolitano Roberto Meléndez

Results and fixtures

The following is a list of match results in the last 12 months, as well as any future matches that have been scheduled.

Legend

2022

2023

Colombia Results and Fixtures – Soccerway.com

All-time results
The following table shows Colombia's all-time international record, correct as of 1 June 2020.

 Source: FIFA, Worldfootball.net

Coaching staff

Current coaching staff

Manager history

As of 18 January 2021, after the match against .

Players

Current squad
The following players were called up for the friendly against Venezuela on 10 April 2022.

Caps and goals accurate up to and including 4 October 2021.

Recent call-ups
The following players have been called up for the squad within the past 12 months.

Records

*Players in bold are still active, at least at club level.

Most capped players

Top goalscorers

Competitive record
*Draws include knockout matches decided on penalty kicks.
**Red border colour indicates tournament was held on home soil.

 Champions   Runners-up  Third place   Fourth place

FIFA Women's World Cup

Olympic Games

CONMEBOL Copa América Femenina

Pan American Games

Central American and Caribbean Games

South American Games

*Draws include knockout matches decided on penalty kicks.

Bolivarian Games

Honours
Intercontinental
 Pan American Games
 Champions (1): 2019 Lima
 Runners-up (1): 2015 Toronto
 Fourth place (1): 2011 Guadalajara
Continental
Copa América Femenina:
 Runners-up (3): 2010, 2014, 2022
 Third place (1): 2003
 Fourth place (1): 2018
Bolivarian Games
 Champions (1): 2009 Sucre
 Runners-up (1): 2005 Colombia

See also

Sport in Colombia
Football in Colombia
Women's football in Colombia
Colombia women's national under-20 football team
Colombia women's national under-17 football team
Colombia women's national futsal team
Colombia men's national football team

References

External links
Official website
FIFA profile

 
South American women's national association football teams